Lesly Paola Calderón Valle (born 19 March 2002), known as Paola Calderón, is a Salvadoran footballer who plays as a forward for CD FAS and El Salvador women's national team.

Early life
Calderón was born in Santa Rita, Chalatenango.

Club career
Calderón has played for AD Legend’s and FAS in El Salvador.

International career
Calderón capped for El Salvador at senior level during the 2020 CONCACAF Women's Olympic Qualifying Championship qualification.

See also
List of El Salvador women's international footballers

References

2002 births
Living people
People from Chalatenango Department
Salvadoran women's footballers
Women's association football forwards
El Salvador women's international footballers